

This article contains a list of circles of latitude on Earth.

Equator 
The equator, a circle of latitude that divides a spheroid, such as Earth, into the northern and southern hemispheres. On Earth, it is an imaginary line located at 0 degrees latitude.

1st parallel

1st parallel north, a circle of latitude in the Northern Hemisphere.
1st parallel south, a circle of latitude in the Southern Hemisphere.

2nd parallel

2nd parallel north, a circle of latitude in the Northern Hemisphere.
2nd parallel south, a circle of latitude in the Southern Hemisphere.

3rd parallel

3rd parallel north, a circle of latitude in the Northern Hemisphere.
3rd parallel south, a circle of latitude in the Southern Hemisphere.

4th parallel

4th parallel north, a circle of latitude in the Northern Hemisphere.
4th parallel south, a circle of latitude in the Southern Hemisphere.

5th parallel

5th parallel north, a circle of latitude in the Northern Hemisphere.
5th parallel south, a circle of latitude in the Southern Hemisphere.

6th parallel

6th parallel north, a circle of latitude in the Northern Hemisphere.
6th parallel south, a circle of latitude in the Southern Hemisphere.

7th parallel

7th parallel north, a circle of latitude in the Northern Hemisphere.
7th parallel south, a circle of latitude in the Southern Hemisphere.

8th parallel

8th parallel north, a circle of latitude in the Northern Hemisphere.
8th parallel south, a circle of latitude in the Southern Hemisphere.

9th parallel

9th parallel north, a circle of latitude in the Northern Hemisphere.
9th parallel south, a circle of latitude in the Southern Hemisphere.

10th parallel

10th parallel north, a circle of latitude in the Northern Hemisphere.
10th parallel south, a circle of latitude in the Southern Hemisphere.

11th parallel

11th parallel north, a circle of latitude in the Northern Hemisphere.
11th parallel south, a circle of latitude in the Southern Hemisphere.

12th parallel

12th parallel north, a circle of latitude in the Northern Hemisphere.
12th parallel south, a circle of latitude in the Southern Hemisphere.

13th parallel

13th parallel north, a circle of latitude in the Northern Hemisphere.
13th parallel south, a circle of latitude in the Southern Hemisphere.

14th parallel

14th parallel north, a circle of latitude in the Northern Hemisphere.
14th parallel south, a circle of latitude in the Southern Hemisphere.

15th parallel

15th parallel north, a circle of latitude in the Northern Hemisphere.
15th parallel south, a circle of latitude in the Southern Hemisphere.

16th parallel

16th parallel north, a circle of latitude in the Northern Hemisphere.
16th parallel south, a circle of latitude in the Southern Hemisphere.

17th parallel

 17th parallel north, a circle of latitude in the Northern Hemisphere. The Vietnamese Demilitarized Zone, between North and South Vietnam (1954–76) was at approximately the 17th parallel north, lending its name to the 1968 documentary film, 17th Parallel: Vietnam in War
 17th parallel south, a circle of latitude in the Southern Hemisphere.

18th parallel
18th parallel north, a circle of latitude in the Northern Hemisphere.
18th parallel south, a circle of latitude in the Southern Hemisphere.

19th parallel

19th parallel north, a circle of latitude in the Northern Hemisphere.
19th parallel south, a circle of latitude in the Southern Hemisphere.

20th parallel

20th parallel north, a circle of latitude in the Northern Hemisphere.
20th parallel south, a circle of latitude in the Southern Hemisphere.

21st parallel

21st parallel north, a circle of latitude in the Northern Hemisphere.
21st parallel south, a circle of latitude in the Southern Hemisphere.

22nd parallel

22nd parallel north, a circle of latitude in the Northern Hemisphere.
22nd parallel south, a circle of latitude in the Southern Hemisphere.

23rd parallel

23rd parallel north, a circle of latitude in the Northern Hemisphere.
23rd parallel south, a circle of latitude in the Southern Hemisphere.

24th parallel

24th parallel north, a circle of latitude in the Northern Hemisphere.
24th parallel south, a circle of latitude in the Southern Hemisphere.

25th parallel

25th parallel north, a circle of latitude in the Northern Hemisphere. This is the origin of the name of 25th Parallel, a local lifestyle magazine from Florida.
25th parallel south, a circle of latitude in the Southern Hemisphere.

26th parallel

26th parallel north, a circle of latitude in the Northern Hemisphere.
26th parallel south, a circle of latitude in the Southern Hemisphere.

27th parallel

27th parallel north, a circle of latitude in the Northern Hemisphere.
27th parallel south, a circle of latitude in the Southern Hemisphere.

28th parallel

28th parallel north, a circle of latitude in the Northern Hemisphere.
28th parallel south, a circle of latitude in the Southern Hemisphere.

29th parallel

29th parallel north, a circle of latitude in the Northern Hemisphere.
29th parallel south, a circle of latitude in the Southern Hemisphere.

30th parallel

30th parallel north, a circle of latitude in the Northern Hemisphere.
30th parallel south, a circle of latitude in the Southern Hemisphere.

31st parallel

31st parallel north, a circle of latitude in the Northern Hemisphere.
31st parallel south, a circle of latitude in the Southern Hemisphere.

32nd parallel

32nd parallel north, a circle of latitude in the Northern Hemisphere.
32nd parallel south, a circle of latitude in the Southern Hemisphere.

33rd parallel

33rd parallel north, a circle of latitude in the Northern Hemisphere.
33rd parallel south, a circle of latitude in the Southern Hemisphere.

34th parallel

34th parallel north, a circle of latitude in the Northern Hemisphere.
34th parallel south, a circle of latitude in the Southern Hemisphere.

35th parallel

35th parallel north, a circle of latitude in the Northern Hemisphere.
35th parallel south, a circle of latitude in the Southern Hemisphere.

36th parallel

36th parallel north, a circle of latitude in the Northern Hemisphere.
36th parallel south, a circle of latitude in the Southern Hemisphere.

37th parallel

37th parallel north, a circle of latitude in the Northern Hemisphere.
37th parallel south, a circle of latitude in the Southern Hemisphere.

38th parallel

38th parallel north, a circle of latitude in the Northern Hemisphere., most notably used as the pre-Korean War boundary between North Korea and South Korea. The 38th parallel structures are a series of circular depressions roughly on the 38th parallel north.
38th parallel south, a circle of latitude in the Southern Hemisphere.

39th parallel

39th parallel north, a circle of latitude in the Northern Hemisphere.
39th parallel south, a circle of latitude in the Southern Hemisphere.

40th parallel

40th parallel north, a circle of latitude in the Northern Hemisphere.
40th parallel south, a circle of latitude in the Southern Hemisphere.

41st parallel

41st parallel north, a circle of latitude in the Northern Hemisphere.
41st parallel south, a circle of latitude in the Southern Hemisphere.

42nd parallel

42nd parallel north, a circle of latitude in the Northern Hemisphere.
42nd parallel south, a circle of latitude in the Southern Hemisphere.

43rd parallel

43rd parallel north, a circle of latitude in the Northern Hemisphere.
43rd parallel south, a circle of latitude in the Southern Hemisphere.

44th parallel

44th parallel north, a circle of latitude in the Northern Hemisphere.
44th parallel south, a circle of latitude in the Southern Hemisphere.

45th parallel

45th parallel north, a circle of latitude in the Northern Hemisphere.
45th parallel south, a circle of latitude in the Southern Hemisphere.

46th parallel

46th parallel north, a circle of latitude in the Northern Hemisphere.
46th parallel south, a circle of latitude in the Southern Hemisphere.

47th parallel

47th parallel north, a circle of latitude in the Northern Hemisphere.
47th parallel south, a circle of latitude in the Southern Hemisphere.

48th parallel

48th parallel north, a circle of latitude in the Northern Hemisphere.
48th parallel south, a circle of latitude in the Southern Hemisphere.

49th parallel

49th parallel north, a circle of latitude in the Northern Hemisphere, which lent its name to the 1941 Canadian and British film, 49th Parallel, and to the K.D. Lang album, Hymns of the 49th Parallel.
49th parallel south, a circle of latitude in the Southern Hemisphere.

50th parallel

50th parallel north, a circle of latitude in the Northern Hemisphere.
50th parallel south, a circle of latitude in the Southern Hemisphere.

51st parallel

51st parallel north, a circle of latitude in the Northern Hemisphere.
51st parallel south, a circle of latitude in the Southern Hemisphere.

52nd parallel

52nd parallel north, a circle of latitude in the Northern Hemisphere.
52nd parallel south, a circle of latitude in the Southern Hemisphere.

53rd parallel

53rd parallel north, a circle of latitude in the Northern Hemisphere.
53rd parallel south, a circle of latitude in the Southern Hemisphere.

54th parallel

54th parallel north, a circle of latitude in the Northern Hemisphere.
54th parallel south, a circle of latitude in the Southern Hemisphere.

55th parallel

55th parallel north, a circle of latitude in the Northern Hemisphere.
55th parallel south, a circle of latitude in the Southern Hemisphere.

Latitude 55°, a 1982 Canadian film

56th parallel

56th parallel north, a circle of latitude in the Northern Hemisphere.
56th parallel south, a circle of latitude in the Southern Hemisphere.

57th parallel

57th parallel north, a circle of latitude in the Northern Hemisphere.
57th parallel south, a circle of latitude in the Southern Hemisphere.

58th parallel

58th parallel north, a circle of latitude in the Northern Hemisphere.
58th parallel south, a circle of latitude in the Southern Hemisphere.

59th parallel

59th parallel north, a circle of latitude in the Northern Hemisphere.
59th parallel south, a circle of latitude in the Southern Hemisphere.

60th parallel

60th parallel north, a circle of latitude in the Northern Hemisphere.
60th parallel south, a circle of latitude in the Southern Hemisphere.

61st parallel

61st parallel north, a circle of latitude in the Northern Hemisphere.
61st parallel south, a circle of latitude in the Southern Hemisphere.

62nd parallel

62nd parallel north, a circle of latitude in the Northern Hemisphere.
62nd parallel south, a circle of latitude in the Southern Hemisphere.

63rd parallel

63rd parallel north, a circle of latitude in the Northern Hemisphere.
63rd parallel south, a circle of latitude in the Southern Hemisphere.

64th parallel

64th parallel north, a circle of latitude in the Northern Hemisphere.
64th parallel south, a circle of latitude in the Southern Hemisphere.

65th parallel

65th parallel north, a circle of latitude in the Northern Hemisphere.
65th parallel south, a circle of latitude in the Southern Hemisphere.

66th parallel

66th parallel north, a circle of latitude in the Northern Hemisphere.
66th parallel south, a circle of latitude in the Southern Hemisphere.

67th parallel

67th parallel north, a circle of latitude in the Northern Hemisphere.
67th parallel south, a circle of latitude in the Southern Hemisphere.

68th parallel

68th parallel north, a circle of latitude in the Northern Hemisphere.
68th parallel south, a circle of latitude in the Southern Hemisphere.

69th parallel

69th parallel north, a circle of latitude in the Northern Hemisphere.
69th parallel south, a circle of latitude in the Southern Hemisphere.

70th parallel

70th parallel north, a circle of latitude in the Northern Hemisphere.
70th parallel south, a circle of latitude in the Southern Hemisphere.

71st parallel

71st parallel north, a circle of latitude in the Northern Hemisphere.
71st parallel south, a circle of latitude in the Southern Hemisphere.

72nd parallel

72nd parallel north, a circle of latitude in the Northern Hemisphere.
72nd parallel south, a circle of latitude in the Southern Hemisphere.

73rd parallel

73rd parallel north, a circle of latitude in the Northern Hemisphere.
73rd parallel south, a circle of latitude in the Southern Hemisphere.

74th parallel

74th parallel north, a circle of latitude in the Northern Hemisphere.
74th parallel south, a circle of latitude in the Southern Hemisphere.

75th parallel

75th parallel north, a circle of latitude in the Northern Hemisphere.
75th parallel south, a circle of latitude in the Southern Hemisphere.

76th parallel

76th parallel north, a circle of latitude in the Northern Hemisphere.
76th parallel south, a circle of latitude in the Southern Hemisphere. The 76th Parallel Escarpment in Antarctica is also known as the Usas Escarpment.

77th parallel

77th parallel north, a circle of latitude in the Northern Hemisphere.
77th parallel south, a circle of latitude in the Southern Hemisphere.

78th parallel

78th parallel north, a circle of latitude in the Northern Hemisphere.
78th parallel south, a circle of latitude in the Southern Hemisphere.

79th parallel

79th parallel north, a circle of latitude in the Northern Hemisphere.
79th parallel south, a circle of latitude in the Southern Hemisphere.

80th parallel

80th parallel north, a circle of latitude in the Northern Hemisphere.
80th parallel south, a circle of latitude in the Southern Hemisphere.

81st parallel

81st parallel north, a circle of latitude in the Northern Hemisphere.
81st parallel south, a circle of latitude in the Southern Hemisphere, in Antarctica

82nd parallel

82nd parallel north, a circle of latitude in the Northern Hemisphere.
82nd parallel south, a circle of latitude in the Southern Hemisphere, in Antarctica

83rd parallel

83rd parallel north, a circle of latitude in the Northern Hemisphere.
83rd parallel south, a circle of latitude in the Southern Hemisphere, in Antarctica

84th parallel

84th parallel north, a circle of latitude in the Northern Hemisphere, in the Arctic Ocean
84th parallel south, a circle of latitude in the Southern Hemisphere, in Antarctica

85th parallel

85th parallel north, a circle of latitude in the Northern Hemisphere, in the Arctic Ocean
85th parallel south, a circle of latitude in the Southern Hemisphere, in Antarctica

86th parallel

86th parallel north, a circle of latitude in the Northern Hemisphere, in the Arctic Ocean
86th parallel south, a circle of latitude in the Southern Hemisphere, in Antarctica

87th parallel

87th parallel north, a circle of latitude in the Northern Hemisphere, in the Arctic Ocean
87th parallel south, a circle of latitude in the Southern Hemisphere, in Antarctica

88th parallel

88th parallel north, a circle of latitude in the Northern Hemisphere, in the Arctic Ocean
88th parallel south, a circle of latitude in the Southern Hemisphere, in Antarctica

89th parallel

89th parallel north, a circle of latitude in the Northern Hemisphere, in the Arctic Ocean
89th parallel south, a circle of latitude in the Southern Hemisphere, in Antarctica

90th parallel

 90th parallel north, the North Pole
 90th parallel south, the South Pole

See also
 Equator
 Tropic of Cancer
 Tropic of Capricorn
 Arctic Circle
 Antarctic Circle